2,6-Diisopropylnaphthalene (2,6-DIPN) is an organic compound with the formula C10H6(i-Pr)2 (where i-Pr = isopropyl). 2,6-DIPN is one of several isomers of diisopropylnaphthalene. It is a white or colorless solid.

2,6-DIPN is plant growth regulator.  It helps inhibit the sprouting of potatoes during storage, especially in combination with chlorpropham. 2,6-DIPN is intended for use in the manufacturing of products intended to prevent sprouting of stored potatoes.

2,6-DIPN can be oxidized to 2,6-naphthalenedicarboxylic acid.

Toxicity 
No risks to human health are expected from exposure.

References 

Naphthalenes
Isopropyl compounds
Aromatic hydrocarbons